Jesús Ronaldo Castillo Rojas (born August 27, 1995) is a Venezuelan professional baseball pitcher who is a free agent.

Castillo signed with the Arizona Diamondbacks as an international free agent in 2011. He spent the 2012 season with the DSL Diamondbacks, going 2–4 with a 5.40 ERA over  innings.

On February 18, 2013, Castillo and Erick Leal were traded to the Chicago Cubs in exchange for Tony Campana. He spent the 2013 season with the VSL Cubs, going 0–2 with a 4.26 ERA over 19 innings. He played for the AZL Cubs in 2014 and 2015, going 1–0 with a 2.67 ERA over  innings in 2014 and going 1–2 with a 4.58 ERA over  innings in 2015.

On August 1, 2016, Castillo was traded to the Los Angeles Angels in exchange for Joe Smith. He split the 2016 season between the Eugene Emeralds and the Burlington Bees, going a combined 5–5 with a 2.87 ERA over  innings. He split the 2017 season between Burlington, Inland Empire 66ers, and the Mobile BayBears, going a combined 9–6 with a 3.32 ERA over  innings.

The Angels added Castillo to their 40-man roster after the 2017 season. He spent the 2018 season with Mobile, going 9–5 with a 4.94 ERA over  innings. Castillo was designated for assignment on March 27, 2019, and outrighted on March 31. He spent 2019 with Mobile, going 6–6 with a 2.71 ERA over  innings. He became a free agent following the 2019 season.

On November 23, 2019, Castillo signed a minor league contract, with an invitation to major league spring training, with the Milwaukee Brewers.

References

External links

1995 births
Living people
People from Bolívar (state)
Venezuelan expatriate baseball players in the United States
Venezuelan baseball players
Baseball pitchers
Minor league baseball players
Dominican Summer League Diamondbacks players
Venezuelan Summer League Cubs players
Arizona League Cubs players
Eugene Emeralds players
Burlington Bees players
Inland Empire 66ers of San Bernardino players
Mobile BayBears players
Mesa Solar Sox players
Nashville Sounds players
Biloxi Shuckers players
Bravos de Margarita players